The Oceanic Pro League (OPL) was the top-level of professional League of Legends competition in Oceania. Founded in 2015 and organized by Riot Games Oceania, the league had eight teams. Matches were live streamed on Twitch and YouTube, the latter having on-demand-video archives for the OPL and the lower division Oceanic Challenger Series (OCS). The winners of OPL Split 1 qualified for the Mid-Season Invitational (MSI), while the winners of Split 2 qualified for the World Championship.

Riot Games announced the dissolution of the OPL on 7 October 2020, citing operation costs and failures to reach company-set goals. It was also announced that players with Oceanic residency would be allowed to participate in North America's LCS without filling an import slot.

ESL Australia announced on 18 December 2020 that they would be creating a new professional league for Oceania in 2021 to replace the OPL. The league was later named League of Legends Circuit Oceania (LCO).

Result

Notes

References

External links 
 

League of Legends competitions